Year of the Dog... Again is the sixth studio album by American rapper DMX. It was released on August 1, 2006 by Ruff Ryders Entertainment, Sony Urban Music and Columbia Records. The album was mostly produced by Swizz Beatz, Scott Storch, with additional production by others. It features guest appearances from Busta Rhymes, Styles P, Amerie, and Jadakiss.

Year of the Dog... Again was supported by two singles: "We in Here" and "Lord Give Me a Sign". The album received generally positive to mixed reviews from music critics but was a moderate commercial success. It debuted at number two on the US Billboard 200 and number one on the US Top R&B/Hip-Hop Albums charts, selling 125,000 copies in its first week. It became DMX's first album to not debut at number one on the Billboard 200.

Critical reception
At Metacritic, the album got a score of 60 out of 100 based on "mixed or average reviews". XXL gave it an "L" score equivalent to three stars out of five and stated, "Clearly, X's poetic touch remains intact. But Year of the Dog relies too heavily on nostalgia, ignoring how hip-hop and DMX himself have changed over the years. Lyrically, the project sounds as if the Dog has been living in isolation for years, rarely shifting from his trademark style. Sadly, if X doesn't learn a few new tricks, things might never be the same…again." HipHopDX gave it a score of 2.5 out of 5 and said, "The album fairly consistent of what DMX has become - lost. Much like his outlandish antics and brushes with the law, X is all over the place on wax, battling incoherence and sane thinking." AllHipHop gave it a score of three-and-a-half out of five stars and said, "DMX is flawless as DMX. He has carved his own niche, perfecting his brand of unfiltered aggression. Legions of DMX loyalist will not be disappointed." About.com also gave it a score of three-and-a-half out of five stars and said, "Despite all the crises occurring in X's personal life, he still finds a way to preserve the breadth and depth of his powerful voice; his voice alone is capable of propelling the album. While the canine theme is hard to mistake, forgiveness, redemption and, ultimately, the presence of a supreme being present themselves as a subtext in X's canine mind. It seems like the dog has found his way home, finally."

Commercial performance
Year of the Dog... Again debuted at number two on the US Billboard 200 chart, selling 126,000 copies in first week, debuting behind NOW 22. This became DMX's sixth US top-ten album and his first album to not debut at number one. In its second week, the album dropped to number nine on the chart, selling an additional 47,000 copies. As of September 2012, the album has sold 346,000 copies in the United States.

Track listing
Credits adapted from the album's liner notes.

Sample credits
 "We in Here" contains samples of "Nobody But You Babe," written by Willie Clarke and Clarence Reid, as performed by Clarence Reid.
 "Baby Motha" contains a sample of "(Let Me Put) Love On Your Mind", written by Felton Pilate, as performed by Con Funk Shun.
 "Walk These Dogs" contains samples of "Set Me Free", written by LeRoy Bell and Casey James, as performed by Teddy Pendergrass.
 "Blown Away" contains samples from "Light From A Distant Shore" and "Fallen Flowers", written by Steve McDonald, as performed by Hollie Smith.

Charts

Weekly charts

Year-end charts

Certifications and sales

References

External links
 

2006 albums
Albums produced by Dame Grease
Albums produced by Scott Storch
Albums produced by Sean Garrett
Albums produced by Swizz Beatz
DMX (rapper) albums
Ruff Ryders Entertainment albums